The Authoritarian Personality is a 1950 sociology book by Theodor W. Adorno, Else Frenkel-Brunswik, Daniel Levinson, and Nevitt Sanford, researchers working at the University of California, Berkeley, during and shortly after World War II.

The Authoritarian Personality "invented a set of criteria by which to define personality traits, ranked these traits and their intensity in any given person on what it called the 'F scale' (F for fascist)." The personality type Adorno et al. identified can be defined by nine traits that were believed to cluster together as the result of childhood experiences. These traits include conventionalism, authoritarian submission, authoritarian aggression, anti-intraception, superstition and stereotypy, power and "toughness", destructiveness and cynicism, projectivity, and exaggerated concerns over sex.

Though criticized at the time for bias and methodology, the book was highly influential in American social sciences, particularly in the first decade after its publication: "No volume published since the war in the field of social psychology has had a greater impact on the direction of the actual empirical work being carried on in the universities today."

Institutional context
The impetus of The Authoritarian Personality was the Holocaust, the attempted genocide of European Jews by Adolf Hitler's National Socialist regime. Adorno had been a member of the "Frankfurt School", a group of philosophers and Marxist theorists who fled Germany when Hitler shut down their Institute for Social Research. Adorno et al. were thus motivated by a desire to identify and measure factors that were believed to contribute to antisemitic and fascist traits. The book was part of a "Studies in Prejudice" series sponsored by the American Jewish Committee's Department of Scientific Research.

Sources and influences
The Authoritarian Personality was based in part on earlier Frankfurt School analyses undertaken in Germany, but with a few key changes. First, their Marxist and radical roots were downplayed.  For example, the earlier "authoritarian personality/revolutionary personality" axis was changed to an "authoritarian personality/democratic personality" axis in America.  Thus, values and behaviors earlier associated with revolutionary Marxism were now associated with support for democracy. Second, the book abandoned and/or modified traditional Marxist sociological and economic explanations for human behavior in favor of psychological explanations, earning scorn from more orthodox Marxists.

Generally, Adorno et al. took an antipositivist position; More generally, the Frankfurt School has been critical of reductionism and the
third-person perspective in the social sciences. Instead, it recognizes that
social science research is inevitably value-laden, which calls for a model of
scientist who is a self-reflective interpreter, rather than a technical
problem-solver.  Furthermore, it assigns a practical purpose in social science.
Following a Marxist tradition, it requires that theories in social
science should not only describe and explain the social world, but also should
serve a human emancipation agenda in all circumstances of oppression and
dominance. This is a different approach in philosophy of science than falsification, more popular in the natural sciences.

Content
A central idea of The Authoritarian Personality is that authoritarianism is the result of a Freudian developmental model. Excessively harsh and punitive parenting was posited to cause children to feel immense anger towards their parents; yet fear of parental disapproval or punishment caused people to not directly confront their parents, but rather to identify with and idolize authority figures. Moreover, the book suggested that authoritarianism was rooted in suppressed homosexuality, which was redirected into outward hostility towards the father, which was, in turn, suppressed for fear of being infantilized and castrated by the father.
This hypothesis was consistent with prevailing psychological theories of the time, and Frenkel-Brunswik reported some preliminary support, but empirical data have generally not confirmed this prediction. Authoritarianism was measured by the F-scale. The "F" was short for "pre-fascist personality." Another major hypothesis of the book is that the authoritarian syndrome is predisposed to right-wing ideology and therefore receptive to fascist governments.

Methodology 
The study employs both quantitative and qualitative components. The first part
of the research resembles a survey type of research with structured
questionnaires. Based on the scores on the questionnaires, a smaller number of
participants was elected for clinical interviews and administration of the
Thematic Apperception Test. Interviews were coded with the techniques of
content analysis.

Sample 

"The majority of the subjects could be characterized as white, non-Jewish,
native-born, middle-class Americans and the authors guessed that their findings
would hold for this population" 

[Critique point]: The individuals were sampled from formal organizations. There
are reasons to believe that there are systematic differences between such a
sample and the aforementioned population (see section Overall Criticism).

Response format 

Likert type items ranging from −3 to +3 without a middle point.

Psychometric scales 

 Anti-Semitism Scale
 Ethnocentrism Scale
 Political & Economical Conservatism Scale

Anti-Semitism scale 

This is a listing of the content categories featured in the items. These traits
are attributed to Jewish people.

 Offensive (conceited, sensual, dirty)
 Threatening (ruthless, competitive, radical)
 Attitudes (discriminative action to be taken)
 Seclusive (clannish, keeping apart from gentiles)
 Intrusive (desire to intrude where not welcome)

All items were phrased in affirmation of the Anti-Semitic sentiment. Brown (2004, p. 48),
together with many others, criticizes this choice as "unwise".

The items were phrased in a superficially moderate language, which nonetheless
conveyed the saliency of Jews to the respondent and a negative sentiment towards
them

Ethnocentrism 

Split-half reliability for the scale was .91 (high). The correlation between
Ethnocentrism and Anti-Semitism scales was .80 (relatively high). This
result is "evidence that antagonism to the culturally unlike is a generalized
sentiment"

Political and economical conservatism 

Split-half reliability for PEC scale was .73 (moderate). The scale's correlation
with A-S and E was not strong, but in none of the groups was it negative. "[...]
neither ethnocentrism nor Anti-Semitism ever showed a tendency to go with
leftist liberal views."

F Scale 

The F scale targets an authoritarian, anti-democratic personality profile that makes a person susceptible to Fascist propaganda. The items were written in accordance to fascist propaganda materials as well as priory held TAT protocol data and interviews with ethnocentric participants.

 Conventionalism: Adherence to conventional values.
 Authoritarian Submission: Towards ingroup authority figures.
 Authoritarian Aggression: Against people who violate conventional values.
 Anti-Intraception: Opposition to subjectivity and imagination.
 Superstition and Stereotypy: Belief in individual fate; thinking in rigid categories.
 Power and Toughness: Concerned with submission and domination; assertion of strength.
 Destructiveness and Cynicism: hostility against human nature.
 Projectivity: Perception of the world as dangerous; tendency to project unconscious impulses.
 Sex: Overly concerned with modern sexual practices.

Across various participant groups, the average item-total correlation was 0.33. Subsequent factor analysis confirmed a one-dimensional structure of these content subsets of items (Eysenck 1954, p 152, ref by Brown, p. 53). The first form of the F-Scale correlated 0.53 with A-S, 0.65 to E and 0.54 to PEC. The scale was revised by dropping items with low item-total correlations and/or low predictive value of A-S and E scores. The revised form correlated by 0.75 to a combined A-S/E scale, and 0.57 to PEC. Ethnocentrism, anti-Semitism and potentiality for fascism were inter-related to each other, as well as to conservatism, although not as prominently.

Correlations with IQ, SES, and education 

Ethnocentrism is negatively correlated with both IQ and years of education. Subsequent analyses by Christie showed that education is the mediating factor in this set of relationships. Intelligence is not as strongly correlated to E per se if years of education are partialed out, the partial correlation being as small as -.20. Christie also estimated the expected correlation between "either IQ and F scores or years of education and F scores for a representative cross-sectional sample, range between -.50 and -.60".

Clinical and projective data

Interviews 

The interviewers were instructed to obtain information of the following areas.
There were more specific instructions and points of emphasis within each of
these areas.

 Vocation
 Income
 Religion
 Clinical Data
 Family Background: Sociological Aspects
 Family Figures: Personal Aspects
 Childhood
 Sex
 Social Relationships
 School
 Politics
 Minorities and Race

[Critique Point] Interviewers (but not coders) were aware of the participants
responses and were instructed to study them before interview. This choice was
also "severely criticized" 

"In considerable degree, [...], the projective data confirm the covariation of
implicit antidemocratic trends with prejudice which was demonstrated by the
questionnaire data".

Construction of personality 

 Self Glorification vs Objective Self Appraisal
 Conventional Idealization of Parents vs Objective Appraisal
 Family status-concerned vs Family status-relaxed

Additional: Coping with Ambivalence about Self and Others, Lack of acceptance
of aggressive feelings towards the parents, Projection of sexual and aggressive
impulses to minorities, and its psychological function. "Repression of impulses
leads to projection which functions as rationalization for an expression.'

[Critique Point]: Coding and Interpretation is informed by psychoanalytic
theory.

Cognitive style 

 Rigidity vs Flexibility
 Intolerance of Ambiguity vs Tolerance of Ambiguity

(see Jaensch's Typology)

[Critique Point] Due to the coders having access to the protocols, the
dependency between prejudice and rigidity may be biased.

Overall criticism

Sampling 

Participants were recruited through formal organizations. Christie reports
though that people belonging to at least one organization differ significantly
from people that do not belong to organizations at all. Thus the sample taken
was not representative of white, non-Jewish, middle-class, Americans. The
correlations between A-S, E and F vary in different samples, subsequent studies
showed. However, a negative correlation was never found between those scales.

Acquiescence Response Set 

Couch and Keniston (1960) addressed the problem of the items being all phrased in an affirmative direction towards anti-Semitism. In a large number of psychometric instruments, they showed that the tendency to respond affirmatively (Yeasayers) or negatively (Naysayers) is a relevant psychological factor despite the content of specific questionnaires.

It is now accepted that a greater proportion of variance can be attributed to
individual response patterns rather than the targeted Anti-Semitic attitude.
This poses a validity problem: The scale may not accurately record the
variable it is intended to measure.

Bass found a .20 correlation between F-scale and an item-by-item reversed version.
(expected correlation if the phrasing played no role would be −1.00)
Christie used more elaborate reversal of items accounting for linguistic and
psychological subtleties preserving the original rationale of the items
preparation. See section on Overall Criticism.

Criticisms of content analyses 

 Interviewer Knowledge of Questionnaire Responses
 Examination of Data in Advance of Coding
 Coding Multiple Variables from the Same Content
 Reporting Inter-rater Reliability for Too General Coding Categories

Explanation in terms of socio-economic status (SES) rather than repression 

"We can easily imagine plausible reasons for the association of each
authoritarian trait with the cluster that includes low IQ, little education, and
low SES and so the explanation of covariation among the traits is simply their
several particular ties to the same underlying factors. [...][However][...]
Norms are not put together at random or incidentally. When they stabilize into a
particular combination it must be because that is a combination that works for
human personalities" (Brown, p. 75)

Left wing authoritarianism 

A number of studies have examined the  external
criterion validity of F scale, with various demographic and political groups.
Such groups included: German cosmetic factory workers (Cohn and Carsch, 1954);
English fascists and communists, compared to 'politically neutral' soldiers
(Coulter, 1953). Both studies found high scores (>5) in F-Scale.

However, the Coulter study also found the Communists scored higher in F-Scale than
the politically neutral group. Eysenck (1954, ref. by Brown, p. 80) commented that Coulter's results indicate
that the F-Scale actually measures general authoritarianism, rather than
fascist tendencies in particular. (see Left-Wing Authoritarianism)

Christie (1956) attributed Coulter's findings to sampling fluctuation, pointing
out the politically neutral group was unusually low in F-Scale, compared to
50 known group means at the time. Rokeach (1960) obtained F-Scale scores from 13
Communist college students in England. Their mean was the lowest of all known
groups.

Brown, (2004, p. 80) states: "... the Berkeley researchers seem to have been correct in their belief that the
F-Scale is a measure of fascism."

Authors and conflicts

Sanford and Levinson were both psychology professors at Berkeley. They did much of the preliminary work on ethnocentrism and statistical measurement. Frenkel-Brunswik examined personality variables and family background with a series of interview studies. Adorno provided a political and sociological perspective to the book. Although Adorno's name heads the alphabetical list of authors, he arrived late to the project and made a relatively small contribution. Adorno, in a 1947 letter to Horkheimer, said that his main contribution was the F-scale, which in the end was the "core of the whole thing." An agreement among the authors held that each one was to sign the individual chapters to which he or she had contributed, and that all four were to sign the chapter on the F-scale; Adorno was credited in 5 of the 23 chapters.

The initially planned title for the book was The Fascist Character and the Measurement of Fascist Trends, but as early as 1947 Adorno feared that the assistants at Berkeley would try to sanitize it to a more innocuous title like Character and Prejudice. The final title was the result of a compromise.

Responses
The Authoritarian Personality inspired extensive research in psychology, sociology, and political science during the 1950s and early 1960s on the relation between personality traits, behavior, and political beliefs. The Authoritarian Personality has often provoked polarized responses: "The Berkeley study of authoritarian personality does not leave many people indifferent".

The study "has been subjected to considerable criticism" since the 1950s, particularly for various methodological flaws, including sample bias and poor psychometric techniques.

In 1973, Gaensslen et al. found that, contrary to predictions by Adorno et al., rigidity/dogmatism is not intrinsically maladaptive; e.g., rigidity can be associated with discipline and productivity.

In 1980, sociologist J.J. Ray argued that the project of The Authoritarian Personality was seriously flawed on several points: for not asking questions regarding libertarian politics (which according to Ray are typically more anti-authoritarian than right- or left-wing politics); for failing to demonstrate that authoritarian/right-wing beliefs are correlated with psychopathology; and, most importantly, for failing to demonstrate that authoritarian beliefs are associated with authoritarian behavior. In 1993, over a decade later, the latter point was also criticized by Billings et al.

The book concludes that right-wing, authoritarian governments produce hostility towards racial, religious, or ethnic minorities. Psychologist Bob Altemeyer argued against that conclusion, saying that Fascist Italy was not characterized by antisemitism, and that Jews occupied high positions in Mussolini's government until pressure from Hitler disenfranchised these Jews.

Rubenstein's research in Israel revealed that Orthodox Jews scored higher on right wing politics and authoritarianism as traits than Reform Jews, and that both groups scored higher than Secular Jews. However, it cannot be said that there is no relationship between traits of Right-Wing Authoritarians and antisemitism. In fact, Adorno's nine traits of the "F scale" are rather general and have been thought to identify fascist as well as anti-Semitic individual attributes. The fact that Rubenstein himself affirms that "the results confirm the validity of the RWA" represents a particularly interesting outcome: Orthodox and Reform Jews in Israel are classified closer to the fascist and anti-Semitic traits, as thought in 1950 by Adorno et al., compared to Secular Jews in Israel.

Some observers have criticized what they saw as a strongly politicized agenda to The Authoritarian Personality. Conservative social critic Christopher Lasch argued that by equating mental health with left-wing politics and associating right-wing politics with an invented "authoritarian" pathology, the book's goal was to eliminate antisemitism by "subjecting the American people to what amounted to collective psychotherapy—by treating them as inmates of an insane asylum". 
The Authoritarian Personality remains widely cited in the social sciences and continues to inspire research interest today.

Hyman and Sheatsley 1954

"Our major criticisms lead us inevitably to conclude that the authors' theory
has not been proved by the data they cite".

Brown 2004

"The most serious defects in the questionnaire work are the inadequate sampling
methods and the operation of response sets. [In spite of that] there is a
substantial residual probability that the chief conclusion of the questionnaire
work is correct: attitudes of Anti-Semitism, ethnocentrism, and authoritarianism
do generally go together. [...] some of the findings of the questionnaire study
were replicated in the projectives study, and while this latter work has its own
deficiencies, some account must be taken for the convergence in the two sets of
data."

"Perhaps the least well supported of all the findings in the Berkeley study are
those concerning the genesis of authoritarianism in childhood. [...] However,
Frenkel-Brunswik has directly studied prejudice in childhood and adolescence.
She reports confirmation of most of the original findings."

Christie and Cook 1958

Christie and Cook (1958) cite 230 titles relating to The Authoritarian
Personality and they conclude that:

"...the overall picture shows consistency of findings in many of the most
intensively studied areas. The E and F scales are found to be significantly
correlated in a wide array of samples and predictions of relationships with
attitudinal measures are almost invariably confirmed"

See also
 Ambiguity tolerance
 Authoritarian personality
 Narcissistic personality disorder
 Right-wing authoritarianism
 Psychohistory
 The Mass Psychology of Fascism

References
Informational notes

Citations

Further reading
 Theodor W. Adorno, Else Frenkel-Brunswik, Daniel Levinson and Nevitt Sanford.  The Authoritarian Personality, Studies in Prejudice Series, Volume 1.  New York:  Harper & Row, 1950.  W. W. Norton & Company paperback reprint edition (1993) .
 
 
 
 
 Gerhardt, Christina. "The Authoritarian Personality: Then and Now." The Routledge International Handbook of Perpetrator Studies. Eds. Zachary Goldberg and Susanne Knittel. Routledge, 2019. 61–73.
 
 
 
 

1950 non-fiction books
American Jewish Committee
English-language books
Harper & Brothers books
Social sciences books
Works about personality
Works by Theodor W. Adorno
Books about authoritarianism